Twice Told Tales is the ninth studio album by Jamestown, New York band 10,000 Maniacs. It is an album that consists of many traditional folk songs from the British Isles. For this album, they team up with producer Armand John Petri, who had worked with the band since 1991, as well as producing their 1999 album The Earth Pressed Flat. Coming back into the fold was founding member John Lombardo, who had supplied the band with a cassette full of songs he loved, as well as putting together the arrangements. The band funded the project through the online direct-to-fan music platform PledgeMusic. The funding drive ran from May 2014 to March 2015. Early promotion of the project included a concert held at the Reg Lenna Center For The Arts in Jamestown, which was also streamed online. The album was released through Cleopatra Records on April 10, 2015.

Reception

Track listing
All songs traditional except "The Song of Wandering Aengus": words by William Butler Yeats, set to music by Travis Edmonson.
 "Lady Mary Ramsey I"
 "The Song of Wandering Aengus"
 "She Moved Through the Fair"
 "Dark Eyed Sailor"
 "Misty Moisty Morning"
 "Bonny May"
 "Canadee-I-O"
 "Do You Love an Apple?"
 "Greenwood Sidey"
 "Carrickfergus"
 "Death of Queen Jane"
 "Wild Mountain Thyme"
 "Marie's Wedding"
 "Lady Mary Ramsay II"

Personnel
10,000 Maniacs
Jerome Augustyniak – drums, percussion
Dennis Drew – keyboards
Jeff Erickson – guitar & vocal
Steve Gustafson – bass guitar
John Lombardo – guitar
Mary Ramsey – vocals, violin, viola

Additional musicians
Susan Ramsey – violin
Bryan Eckenrode – cello
Armand John Petri – mellotron
Joe Rozler – string trio arrangement on "Death of Queen Jane"
Danny Hicks/Timothy Patrick Quill – handclaps on "Canadee-I-O"

Additional album credits
Produced and engineered by Armand John Petri
Mastering Engineer Bernd Gottinger
Design by Don Keller
Cover collage by John Lombardo
Creative Direction: John Lombardo
Executive Producers: Donald Semmens, Adam Zeitz, Julie Gochenour, Flavio Louzada, Henry Houh, Andreas Laemmermann, Catherine Fredericks, Damon Torres, Therese Fisher, Tom Galloway, Brian Matthias, Murry Galloway, Nicholas Randall, James Lawrence, Richard C. Castagana Jr., Martin Ziesch, Alexander Glintschert, Mike Bleecher, Jeff Crabill, Mick Mueller, Frits Demortier, Stephen Monroe, Rick Strezo, Gehrig Peterson, Harvey Kivel, Alan Cohen, James Serio, Alistair McLean, Laurie Gengo, Wesley Costas

References

External links

10,000 Maniacs albums
2015 albums
Covers albums
Cleopatra Records albums
British folk music